Chilly-Mazarin is a commune in the southern suburbs of Paris, France.

A small part of Orly International Airport lies on the territory of the commune of Chilly-Mazarin.

Inhabitants of Chilly-Mazarin are known as Chiroquois.

History
Chilly-Mazarin developed around a Roman villa named Cailliacum which evolved into Chailly then Chilly. The suffix -Mazarin was added in 1822 to distinguish it from other French villages named Chilly and refers to the Mazarinettes, the famed nieces of Cardinal Mazarin who resided several years at a mansion in Chilly. The fourth niece, Hortense Mancini, transmitted to her son the titles of Marquess of Chilly and Duke of Mazarin which were ultimately passed to the House of Grimaldi, reigning house of Monaco.

Population

Transport
Chilly-Mazarin is served by Chilly-Mazarin station on Paris RER line C.

Education
There are:
 Seven preschools (écoles maternelles): du Centre, du Château, Les Roseaux, Les Saules, Pasteur, and Pauline Kergomard
 Four elementary schools: du Château, Jean-de-la-Fontaine, Pasteur, and Pierre et Marie Curie

There is a junior high school, Collège les Dînes Chiens, which opened in 1968.

Area high schools include:
 Lycée Marguerite-Yourcenar - Morangis
 Lycée Jacques-Prévert - Longjumeau
 Lycée des Métiers Jean-Perrin – Longjumeau

See also

Communes of the Essonne department

References

External links

Official website 

Mayors of Essonne Association 

Communes of Essonne